Rhytidiella is a genus of fungi in the family Cucurbitariaceae. According to the 2007 Outline of Ascomycota, the placement of the genus in this family in uncertain.

References

External links
Index Fungorum

Pleosporales